Cyril Dubroca (born February 8, 1981 in Mont-de-Marsan) is a French professional football player who  plays in the Championnat de France amateur for Genêts Anglet.

He played on the professional level in Ligue 1 for Toulouse FC.

1981 births
Living people
French footballers
Ligue 1 players
Toulouse FC players
Trélissac FC players
Genêts Anglet players
Association football defenders
Sportspeople from Landes (department)
Footballers from Nouvelle-Aquitaine